Getik Baghdasarian  also Baghdasaryan(born 26 February 1949, Sisian, Syunik Province) is an Armenian sculptor based in Yerevan. He is a nephew of architect Baghdasar Arzoumanian.

Education and academic career
From 1964–68, Baghdasarian studied in the Terlemezian Fine Arts College. Then he  graduated with honors from the Sculpture Department of the Fine Arts and Drama Institute (1969–1974). He has been a member of the faculty at the Yerevan Fine Arts Academy since 1975, and the head of the Sculpture Department since 1993.

In 2006, he was the winner for sculpture of the annual arts awards, instituted by the president of Armenia. The prize was a medal, diploma and 2.5 million drams. Baghdasarian's winning work was a monument erected two years previously in Sisian to the writer Hamo Sahian. One of his famous compatriots and colleagues is talented sculptor Rafik Khachatryan (1937-1993).

Exhibitions/awards
Getik Baghdasaryan participated in the following exhibitions

1980  	"We build Communism" exhibitions in Yerevan, Armenia and Moscow, Russia
1983 	"The man and the Land", Moscow, Russia
1984 	"Our Contemporary", Moscow – Czech Republic (2nd prize)
1984   Single Piece Exhibition, Best Work Award for “Arno Babajanyan”, Yerevan, Armenia
1985   Winner “A. Babajanyan”, “Paravon Mirzoyan” in USSR international contest
1989   Diplomat USSR Fine Arts Academy “Horse takers” and “A. Babajanyan”
1989 	personal exhibitions at Moscow Lazarev Gymnasia
1991 	"Sculpture 91", Yerevan, Armenia – Moscow, Russia
1993 	13 Artist's Exhibition, Kochar museum, Yerevan, Armenia
1994   Winner “Paradise – Life – Hades”, Dante’ contest, Ravenna, Italy
1998 	Exhibition-competition dedicated to Dante along with 12 Armenian sculptures, Florence (awarded with gold medal)
2001   Centro Dantesco, Ravenna, Italy
2001 	exhibition dedicated to 1700 anniversary of adopting Christianity in Armenia, awarded with the prize for the best work
2003   “Vahagn” award in national contest for 12 reliefs in Gyumri St. Hakob Church, Armenia
2004   Exhibiting in “Gevorgyan Gallery”, Yerevan, Armenia
2005   Galerie Bel Air, Geneva, Switzerland
2006   Exhibition of Contemporary Art, Gevorgian Gallery, Yerevan, Armenia

Solo exhibitions
1989   "Sculpture 81", Lazaryan gymnasium, Moscow, Russia
1999   Artists Union, Yerevan, Armenia
2004   “Albert and Tove Boyajyan” Gallery, Yerevan, Armenia

Sculptures

1982  	"The Pope's Monument" in Echmiadzin
1982 	"Hazaran Blbul" in Arzni
1985 	"Zitan" symposium in Ijevan
1986 	"Hazaran Blbul" symposium in Ijevan
1987 	Zangezur Gateways
1988 	"Ktrich's Monument" in Sisian
1990 	"Fairytale" symposium in Ijevan
1999 	12 bas-relief in Saint Sargis Church, Yerevan
2001 	"Sculpture of Saint Thaddeus" in Saint Gregory the Illuminator Cathedral, Yerevan

Also have works in Moscow Tretyakov Gallery, State Gallery of Ivanov city-Russia, State Gallery of Tiumen city-Russia, Yeghishe Charent's house museum in Yerevan and Charentsavan, Museum of Wood Art in Yerevan, Bergori museum in Lachin and a number of other places.
His works are comprised in private collections of different countries of the world: Belgium, Poland, Hungary, Check Republic, the US, Sudan, Italy, Denmark, China, Germany, UAE, Russia, France, Armenia and a number of other countries.

Other awards
2008 Tekeyan Award for the sculpture of Yeghishe Charents.
2010 The Boghossian Prize for the statue of Nerses Ashtaraketsi in Ashtarak, Armenia.

References

External links
Getik Baghdasarian's biography (in Armenian)
– Getik Baghdasaryan – Participating Sculptors – "Noreon" Creative Center
Getik Baghdasaryan – myART
Film about Getik Baghdasaryan (in Armenian)

1949 births
Living people
20th-century Armenian sculptors
21st-century Armenian sculptors